Aktien-Gesellschaft Vulcan Stettin (short AG Vulcan Stettin) was a German shipbuilding and locomotive building company. Founded in 1851, it was located near the former eastern German city of Stettin, today Polish Szczecin. Because of the limited facilities in Stettin, in 1907 an additional yard was built in Hamburg. The now named Vulcan-Werke Hamburg und Stettin Actiengesellschaft constructed some of the most famous civilian German ships and it played a significant role in both World Wars, building warships for the Kaiserliche Marine and the Kriegsmarine later.

Both yards became members of the Deschimag in the 1920s. The Stettin shipyard was closed in 1928, opened again in 1939.

History

A.G. Vulcan Stettin was  founded 1851 as Schiffswerft und Maschinenfabrik Früchtenicht & Brock  by the two young engineers Franz F. D. Früchtenicht and Franz W. Brock in the little village Bredow, which later became suburb of the eastern German city of Stettin. Its first ship was the small iron paddle steamer, named Die Dievenow for the service between the cities of Stettin and Swinemünde. Several small vessels followed, while the yard continuously was enlarged.

When the yard went into financial problems, in 1857 the company was taken over by some entrepreneurs and politicians from Stettin and Berlin which founded the new company  Stettiner  Maschinenbau  Actien-Gesellschaft Vulcan. Ship construction was continued, but the solution of the financial trouble was expected by additionally constructing locomotives. A subsidiary company was founded, called Abteilung Locomotivbau in Bredow bei Stettin. In 1859 the first locomotive was delivered; all together the company built about 4,000 units in Stettin until it was sold to the Berlin company Borsig.

In the future larger and larger ships were built, the facilities in Stettin could no longer sustain the scale of the operations. The yard built the s.

Thus a new shipyard was built in Hamburg between 1907 and 1909. From 1911, it was named Vulcan-Werke Hamburg und Stettin Actiengesellschaft. The Hamburg yard was the scene of a week-long strike in 1918 which was only brought to a close through the reading of the War Clauses.

Automatic transmissions for motor vehicles
Gustav Bauer, director of the marine engine section, supervised the work of Hermann Föttinger on the Fottinger hydraulic transmitter known as Vulcan Coupling and Vulcan Drive or fluid coupling. In 1924, Vulcan's Hermann Rieseler invented one of the first automatic transmissions, which had a two-speed planetary gearbox, torque converter, and lockup clutch; it never entered production. (The less-sophisticated Hydra-Matic, which used a simple fluid coupling, was an available option on Oldsmobiles in 1940.) The original coupling further developed in collaboration with Harold Sinclair of Fluidrive Engineering of Isleworth for Daimler of Coventry and matched with a manually controlled epicyclic gearbox went into production in England in 1929.

Shutdown
In 1928 Vulcan Stettin went bankrupt and sold its Hamburg shipyard in 1930. The AG Vulcan Stettin had been closed.

New enterprise
1939 a new company - also named Vulcan - was founded on the site of the former Stettin-shipyard. All together 34 construction numbers were started in the following years, including 18 type-VII C submarines. But because of the war only a few ships could be launched and completed. Among these were two submarines,  but only one of them was ever in service while the second one was destroyed by allied air attacks before.
During the war the yard exploited slave workers and had its own prisoner camp, part of the prisoner population engaged in anti-Nazi resistance, successfully sabotaging several constructed ships
After World War II the slave workers were freed and the shipyard was finally taken over by the Polish government and the  new Szczecin Shipyard was started at this site. The Szczecin Shipyard named one of its wharfs "Wulkan" and two slipways "Wulkan 1" and "Wulkan Nowa".

Ships built by AG Vulcan Stettin (selection)
 1851, Constr.No. 1, Paddle steamer Die Dievenow, first built ship
 1879,  for Shipping Company on the Don, Azov and Black Seas with their tributaries. After 1886 belonged to Russian Steam Navigation and Trading Company
 1880, Corvette Olga
 1887,  protected cruiser  for Kaiserliche Marine (Imperial German Navy); 1922 broken up
 1889, Scandia Hamburg America Line liner, sold to U.S. Army Quartermaster Department 1898 serving as U.S. Army Transport Warren until 1922, sold, burned sunk Shanghai 1924
 1891,   for Kaiserliche Marine, 1910 sold to the Osman Navy
 1892, Aviso and imperial yacht  for Kaiser Wilhelm II; 1923 broken up
 1897, 4-funnel  , won 1898 Blue Riband
 1897, Passenger ship Königin Luise for Norddeutscher Lloyd (NDL), 1935 broken up
 1897–1899,  great cruisers  and 
 1899, Steamer König Albert  for NDL, 1926 broken up
 1901, Pre-dreadnought battleship  for Kaiserliche Marine
 1900, Passenger ship Deutschland
 1902, 4-funnel Kaiser-class ocean liner 
 1902, Pre-dreadnought battleship  for Kaiserliche Marine
 1903, Torpedo boat 
 1905, Pre-dreadnought   for Kaiserliche Marine; sunk in Battle of Jütland in June 1916
 1906, Passenger ship Kaiserin Auguste Victoria
 1906, 4-funnel Kaiser-class ocean liner 
 1907,  light cruiser  for Kaiserliche Marine
 1909,   for Kaiserliche Marine, became later Osman cruiser , sunk 1918 by mines
 1907, Passenger ship 
 1907, Passenger ship  
 1907,   for Kaiserliche Marine
 1909, CNo. 294, small experimental ship Föttinger Transformator with steam turbine and hydrodynamic transmission (Föttinger Transformator) propulsion
 1909,   for Kaiserliche Marine; sunk 1914 in the Battle of Helgoland Bight
 1910, cruiser ROU Uruguay, for National Navy of Uruguay. Out of service in 1951, scrapped in the 1960s. 
 1914, Imperial yacht  for Kaiser Wilhelm II, not in service, 1923 scrapped in Hamburg
 1915,    for Kaiserliche Marine
 1913, Passenger ship  for HAPAG, not finished during war, 1919 British war-booty and renamed , 1952 scrapped
 1913, Passenger ship  for Norddeutscher Lloyd, supply ship for German raiders in World War I, seized by Peru 1917, renamed Callao, chartered by United States Shipping Board (USSB) and transferred to U.S. Navy 26 April 1919 and commissioned USS Callao (ID-4036), decommissioned 20 September 1919. Sold at auction by USSB, renamed Ruth Alexander by Dollar Steamship Lines.
 1914–1918, All together 32 torpedo boats ( - ,  - ,  - ,  and )
 1916–1917,  Rostock and  Wiesbaden, both not finished before the end of the war
 1922, Passenger steamer München for NDL, 1931 renamed  and 1938 only Steuben, sunk 1945 in the Baltic Sea by Soviet submarine , about 3,000 people, mainly refugees, killed
 1923, Passenger steamer Stuttgart for NDL, sunk 1943 by US Air Force
 1926, Passenger ship  for beach resort service, used as minelayer in WWII, 1942 sunk by Royal Air Force in Rotterdam

Ships built by AG Vulcan Hamburg (selection)
 1911/12,   for Kaiserliche Marine
 1913/14, Passenger ship 
 1913/14,   for Kaiserliche Marine
 1913/14, Merchant ship 
 1914, Battleship Salamis for Hellenic Navy, construction stopped with beginning of war, 1932 scrapped in Bremen
 1915–1917, All together 69 U-boats of types UE 1, UE 2, UB III, UC I and UC II for Kaiserliche Marine
 1916, Modified   (Replacement Yorck), construction stopped and after war broken up
 1917,   for Kaiserliche Marine, not finished before end of war
 1922, Merchant ship Cap Norte

Ships built by AG Vulcan Stettin (selection)

Civilian ships

  (1896)
  (1900)
  (1902)
  (1906)
  (1906)
  (1907)
  (1907)
  (1913)

Naval ships

Battleships
  (1881)
  (1882)
  (1890)
  (1890)
  (1900)
  (1902)
  (1904)
  (1907)

Cruisers

  (1883)
  (1887)
  (1887)
  (1887)
  (1897)
  (1897)
  (1897)
  (1898)
  (1901)
  (1902)
  (1903)
  (1906)
  (1908)
  (1910)
  (1913)
  (1915)
  (1915)
  (1915)

Destroyers

  (1906)
  (1906)
  (1907)
  (1907)
  (1912)
  (1912)

Submarines (U-boats)
 Type VII-C U-boats (1941), out of six commissioned, only one,  was ever in service.

Torpedo Boats
  (1914)
  (1914)
  (1914)
  (1914)
  (1914)
  (1914)
  (1915)
  (1915)
  (1915)
  (1915)
  (1915)
  (1915)
  (1915)
  (1915)
  (1916)
  (1916)
  (1916)
  (1916)
  (1916)
  (1916)
  (1916)
  (1916)
  (1916)
  (1916)
  (1916)
  (1916)
  (1916)
  (1916)
  (1916)
  (1916)
 , ex-Dutch Z-4, later Polish 
  (1918)

Ships still afloat
 Gryfia, ex-Tyras (1887), small railway ferry, today in Szczecin, Poland
 Wittow (1895), small railway ferry, today shown in the harbour of Barth, Germany
 Icebreaker Suur Tõll, today a museum ship in Tallinn, Estonia

References

 Armin Wulle: Der Stettiner Vulcan. Ein Kapitel deutscher Schiffbaugeschichte. Koehlers Verlagsgesellschaft mbH, Herford 1989, 
 Dieter Grusenick: Lokomotivbau bei der Stettiner Maschinenbau AG „Vulcan“. B. Neddermeyer VBN, Berlin 2006, 
 Christian Ostersehlte: Von Howaldt zu HDW. 165 Jahre Entwicklung von einer Kieler Eisengießerei zum weltweit operierenden Schiffbau- und Technologiekonzern. Koehler-Mittler, Hamburg 2004, 
 Arnold Kludas: Die Geschichte der Deutschen Passagierschiffahrt. Band 1: Die Pionierjahre von 1850 – 1990 (= Schriften des Deutschen Schiffahrtsmuseums. Bd. 18). Ernst Kabel Verlag GmbH, Hamburg 1986, 
 Arnold Kludas; Die Seeschiffe des Norddeutschen Lloyd 1857  bis 1970, Weltbild Verlag GmbH, Augsburg 1998, 
 Bodo Herzog, Deutsche U-Boote 1906 – 1966, Manfred Pawlak Verlagsgesellschaft mbh, Herrsching 1990, 
 Siegfried Breyer, Schlachtschiffe und Schlachtkreuzer 1905 - 1970J. F. Lehmanns Verlag München 1970,

External links
 Summary of AG Vulcan Stettin
 Eisenbahnbau bei Vulcan 

AG Vulcan Stettin